Dumzoy (Yaghnobi: Дүмзой) is a village in Sughd Region, northwestern Tajikistan. It is part of the jamoat Anzob in the Ayni District. Its population was 5 in 2017.

References

Populated places in Sughd Region
Yaghnob